Angelo Maggi Mariotti (born 16 December 1955) is an Italian actor and voice actor.

Biography
Born in Rome, Maggi rose to fame in the 1980s as an actor. During that time, he made at least six film appearances and was quite popular on stage early in his career. He is more successful as a voice dubber, as he is the official Italian dubbing voice of Tom Hanks, Bruce Willis and Jackie Chan. Other actors he dubs includes Steve Guttenberg, Gary Oldman, Danny Huston, John Turturro and Robert Downey Jr.

Maggi's character dubbing roles include Perry Cox (portrayed by John C. McGinley) in Scrubs, Leroy Jethro Gibbs (portrayed by Mark Harmon) in NCIS and Tony Stark (portrayed by Robert Downey Jr.) in the Marvel Cinematic Universe. In his animated roles, Maggi has been the current Italian voice of Chief Wiggum in The Simpsons since the fifth season. He even provided the Italian voice of Sheriff Woody in the animated film Toy Story 4 following the death of Woody's longtime Italian dubber Fabrizio Frizzi the previous year.

Filmography

Cinema
Di padre in figlio (1982)
Sapore di mare (1983)
Zero for Conduct (1983) - Renato Petrocelli / Speedy Gonzales
Dagger Eyes (1983)
Time for Loving 2 - One Year Later (1983) - Marchesino Pucci
Vacanze in America (1984)
Mi faccia causa (1984)
Il coraggio di parlare (1987) - Gino, the pusher
Stradivari (1988) - Opera Singer
Ascolta la canzone del vento (2003) - Dad

Television
Time for Loving (1982)
L'amore non basta (2005) - Guido
Paul VI: The Pope in the Tempest (2008) - Eugenio Pacelli
Il delitto di via Poma (2011) - Recchia

Dubbing roles

Animation 
 Shotaro Kaneda in Akira
 Superman in Superman: The Animated Series
 Michael Stone in Anomalisa
 Sheriff Woody in Toy Story 4
 Rei's Grandpa in Sailor Moon (Viz Media redub)
 Chief Wiggum and Reverend Lovejoy in The Simpsons
 Abraham Van Helsing in Hotel Transylvania 3: Summer Vacation
 Monkey in Kung Fu Panda
 Monkey in Kung Fu Panda 2
 Monkey in Kung Fu Panda 3
 Monkey in Kung Fu Panda: Legends of Awesomeness

Live action
 Tony Stark / Iron Man in Iron Man
 Tony Stark / Iron Man in Iron Man 2
 Tony Stark / Iron Man in Iron Man 3
 Tony Stark / Iron Man in The Incredible Hulk
 Tony Stark / Iron Man in The Avengers
 Tony Stark / Iron Man in Avengers: Age of Ultron
 Tony Stark / Iron Man in Captain America: Civil War
 Tony Stark / Iron Man in Spider-Man: Homecoming
 Tony Stark / Iron Man in Avengers: Infinity War
 Tony Stark / Iron Man in Avengers: Endgame
 Tony Stark / Iron Man in Spider-Man: Far From Home
 Tony Stark / Iron Man in Black Widow 
 Yang Naing Lee in Rush Hour
 Yang Naing Lee in Rush Hour 2
 Yang Naing Lee in Rush Hour 3
 Seymour Simmons in Transformers
 Seymour Simmons in Transformers: Revenge of the Fallen
 Seymour Simmons in Transformers: Dark of the Moon
 Seymour Simmons in Transformers: The Last Knight
 James Gordon in The Dark Knight
 James Gordon in The Dark Knight Rises
 William Thacker in Notting Hill
 David in Love Actually
 Raymond Reddington in The Blacklist
 Roger Callaway in It Takes Two
 Tim Carson in Casper: A Spirited Beginning
 Jack Frye in The Aviator
 Isaac French/Dr. Miles Phoenix in The Number 23
 William Stryker in X-Men Origins: Wolverine
 King Richard the Lionheart in Robin Hood
 Leroy Jethro Gibbs in NCIS
 Malcolm Crowe in The Sixth Sense
 Christopher Marlowe in Shakespeare in Love
 Oberon in A Midsummer Night's Dream
 David Dunn in Unbreakable
 Larry Mazilli in Clockers
 Pete Hogwallop in O Brother, Where Art Thou?
 Dr. Andrew Brown in Everwood
 Chuck Noland in Cast Away
 Carl Hanratty in Catch Me If You Can
 Viktor Navorski in The Terminal
 James B. Donovan in Bridge of Spies
 Perry Cox in Scrubs
 Robby Ray Stewart in Hannah Montana

References

External links

1955 births
Living people
Male actors from Rome
Italian male voice actors
Italian male film actors
Italian male television actors
Italian male stage actors
Italian voice directors
20th-century Italian male actors
21st-century Italian male actors